Zilaya, is a village located in the Western Beqaa District of the Beqaa Governorate in Lebanon.

History
In 1838, Eli Smith noted  Zellaya  as a  village on the West side of the Beqaa Valley, south of Yohmor.

References

Bibliography

External links
Zilaya, localiban

Populated places in Western Beqaa District